Hôtel de Ville (literally "City Hall") is a rapid transit station on lines 1 and 11 of the Paris Métro. It is named after the nearby Hôtel de Ville de Paris (City Hall) and is located within the fourth arrondissement of Paris.

History
Hôtel de Ville is one of the eight original stations opened as part of the first stage of line 1 between Porte de Vincennes and Porte Maillot on 19 July 1900. The line 11 platforms opened as part of the original section of the line from Châtelet to Porte des Lilas on 28 April 1935. During the same decade, the platforms of line 1 were extended to 105 metres to cater for 7-car trains which ultimately did not materialise.

A plaque near the platforms of line 1 marks the 50th anniversary of the strike organised by 3000 employees of the Compagnie du chemin de fer métropolitain de Paris (CMP), the operator of the métro then, on 16 August 1944 against the Nazis during the occupation of Paris and was triggered by the French Forces to liberate the capital.

In 1974, the original Guimard entrance at rue de Lobau was moved to Abbesses, and is one of the only two remaining glass-covered "dragonfly" entrances, known as édicules (the other is at Porte Dauphine). It was listed as a historical monument on 25 July 1965.

As part of the "Un métro + beau" programme by the RATP, the platforms of line 11 were renovated and modernised on 2005.

During the automation of line 1, the platforms of line 1 had undergone a series of upgrades. Over the weekend of 21–22 March 2009, its platforms were closed to raise its platform levels for the installation platform edge doors to improve passenger safety and for automation which were done in April 2010. During the construction period, the platforms of line 11 remained open, allowing for westward travel to Châtelet, where a transfer to line 1 was possible. The line was fully automated in December 2012.

As part of modernization works for the extension of line 11 to Rosny-Bois-Perrier in 2023 for the Grand Paris Express, the station was closed from 8 September 2018 to 12 October 2018 to raise its platform levels and its surface tiled to accommodate the new rolling stock that will be used (MP 14) to accommodate the expected increase in passengers and to improve the station's accessibility. From 18 March 2019 to 16 December 2019, the station acted as line 11's western terminus when its original terminus, Châtelet, was closed for 9 months to lengthen the platforms to cater for 5-car trains as it could only cater for 4 at the time. Hence, trains arrived and departed from the western platform, usually used for trains heading to Châtelet, with the other platform temporarily not in use. On 11 December 2020, an additional entrance was opened at rue du Temple.

In 2019, the station was used by 12 307 363 passengers, making it the 11th busiest of the Métro network out of 302 stations.

In 2020, the station was used by 5,673,100 passengers amidst the COVID-19 pandemic, making it the 13th busiest of the Métro network out of 305 stations.

Passenger services

Access 
The station has 7 entrances:

 Entrance 1: rue de Rivoli
 Entrance 2: rue du Renard
 Entrance 3: rue de la Coutellerie
 Entrance 4: avenue Victoria
 Entrance 5: Hôtel de Ville
 Entrance 6: rue de Lobau
 Entrance 7: rue du Temple

Station layout

Platforms 
Both have a standard configuration with 2 tracks surrounded by 2 side platforms. Line 1's station is built with its ceiling flush with the ground made of metal with its western end having a reinforced concrete ceiling to cater for the then planned 7-car trains while line 11's station consists of an elliptical vault.

Other connections 
The station is also served by lines 38, 67, 69, 70, 72, 74, 76, and 96 of the RATP bus network, and at night, by lines N11and N16 Noctilien bus network.

Nearby 

 Bazar de l'Hôtel de Ville
 Hôtel de ville de Paris
 Mairie du 4e arrondissement

Gallery

References

See also
 List of stations of the Paris Métro

Paris Métro line 1
Paris Métro line 11
Paris Métro stations in the 4th arrondissement of Paris
Railway stations in France opened in 1900